Full Metal Jacket Diary is a book written by American author, actor and photographer Matthew Modine and published by Rugged Land October 25, 2005. The book contains photos and diary entries of his experiences over a two-year period while working on the Stanley Kubrick film, Full Metal Jacket.

Modine played the lead role of Private Joker, a U.S. Marine who is sent to Vietnam as a war correspondent for Stars and Stripes. While filming, Modine was encouraged by Kubrick to keep a diary of his experiences. Notorious for his closed film sets, Kubrick granted Modine the rare privilege of photographing the process, capturing moments on the set. Modine felt keeping a photographic and written diary would be a beneficial opportunity for his preparation as a war correspondent in the film.

Modine used a Roleiflex camera, capturing glimpses of Kubrick's artistic and professional process. Full Metal Jacket Diary was published in limited edition book form in 2005 with a metal book jacket. "I always wanted to do something with the pictures because I think they're beautiful..." says Modine of his decision to publish the book. "Now I feel enough time passed and I can look back at those days as being part of another person's life, this young kid who went on a journey to work with a legend..."

In addition to being a critical success, the book won the AIGA "50 Books/50 Covers of 2006" design award with a juror noting that it's "the only book I can imagine covered in a metal jacket".

In 2010, Modine partnered with producer Adam Rackoff to begin transforming his book into an interactive iPad application, by raising funds through Kickstarter.

References

External links

 The Official “Full Metal Jacket Diary” Web site

2005 books
Kickstarter-funded software